Zhao Xu may refer to:

 Emperor Shenzong of Song (1048–1085), Song dynasty Emperor with the personal name Zhao Xu
 Emperor Zhezong (1076–1100), Song dynasty Emperor with the personal name Zhao Xu
 Zhao Xu (athlete) (born 1985), Paralympian athlete from China